Below is an incomplete list of those who have served as treasurer to British royal consorts.

Treasurers to Caroline, Princess of Wales, later Queen Caroline (1714–1737) 
 1727–1730: Sir William Strickland, 4th Baronet
 1730–1737: John Selwyn

Treasurers to Queen Charlotte (1761–1818) 
 1761–1773: Andrew Stone
 1774–1790: Francis North, 1st Earl of Guilford
 1790–1792: Vacant?
 1792–1814: Thomas Brudenell-Bruce, 1st Earl of Ailesbury
 1814–1816: Richard Howard, 4th Earl of Effingham
 1817–1818: Herbert Taylor

Treasurers to Queen Adelaide (1830–1837) 
 1830–1834: John Barton (later Sir John Barton)
 1834–1837: Hon. William Ashley

Treasurers to Alexandra, Princess of Wales, later Queen Alexandra (1873–1925) 
 1901–1923: Frederick Robinson, Earl de Grey (Marquess of Ripon from 1909)
 1923–1925: Vacant?

Treasurers to Queen Mary (1910–1953) 
 1910–?: Hon. Alexander Hood
 1932–1936: Sir Harry Lloyd-Verney

Treasurers to Queen Elizabeth (1937–2002) 
 1937–1945: Sir Basil Brooke
 1946–1960: Sir Arthur Penn
 1961–1998: Sir Ralph Anstruther, 7th Baronet Later Treasurer Emeritus
 1998–2002: Hon. Nicholas Assheton

Treasurers to Prince Philip, Duke of Edinburgh (1952–1995) 
 1952–1959: Sir Frederick Browning
 1957–1960: David Alexander (acting)
 1959–1970: Christopher Bonham-Carter
 1970–1982: Lord Rupert Nevill
 1982–1984: Sir Richard Davies (acting)
 1984–1995: Sir Brian McGrath

Treasurers to Queen Camilla (since 2022)

See also 
 Treasurer of the Household

References 

Positions within the British Royal Household
Lists of office-holders in the United Kingdom